Vakil Abad Metro Station is the western terminus of Mashhad Metro Line 1. The station opened on 10 October 2011. It is located on western end of Vakilabad Expressway. The station will also be the eastern terminus of Mashhad-Golbahar Commuter Rail Line.

References

Mashhad Metro stations
Railway stations opened in 2011
2011 establishments in Iran